Hyphessobrycon coelestinus is a species of South American tetra, belonging to the family Characidae.

Description 
Hyphessobrycon coelestinus is quite similar to Hyphessobrycon columbianus in shape and coloration. Differences include a red head and red band above the midlateral line starting at the gills and ending at the dorsal fin.

Distribution 
Hyphessobrycon coelestinus is known to inhabit the Upper Paraná River Basin in Brazil. This fish is benthopelagic, meaning that it resides away from the surface of the water.

References 
https://www.fishbase.in/summary/51020
https://www.gbif.org/species/125976604
https://www.discoverlife.org/20/q?search=Hyphessobrycon+coelestinus&b=FB51020

Fish of South America
Tetras
Characidae